Iris oratoria, known by the common name Mediterranean mantis (or less frequently iris mantis), due to humans first studying it in lands around the Mediterranean Sea, is a species of praying mantis. Its range is expanding in the Middle East, Western Asia and the United States.

Range
Albania, Bulgaria, Brač Island, Korčula Island, France (Including Corsica), Greece (Including Ionian Islands, Crete, Cyclades Islands), Italy (Including Sardinia, Sicily), North Macedonia, Portugal, Spain (Including Balearic Islands),  Yugoslavia (Including Serbia, Kosovo, Voivodina, Montenegro), North Africa (Morocco, Algeria, Tunisia, Libya, Egypt, North Chad), Cyprus, West, Central and South Asia (Asian Turkey, India, Israel, Iran, Jordan, Lebanon, Pakistan, Palestine, Syria, Turkestan), Non-native to the Southwestern United States (Arizona, California, Nevada, Texas.).

Appearance

I. oratoria is very pale when young but matures to grass green, and grows to about 6.5 cm long.  The species may be distinguished from Mantis religiosa and other mantids with which it shares a range and general size and shape by the red-orange spot on the ventral side of the fourth (second to last) abdominal segment; also, its cerci are shorter than those of M. religiosa. The species is distinctive in having two large startling violet-brown eyespots on its hind wings which are revealed when its wings are unfolded. The adult is more slender than Tenodera sinensis, more like Mantis religiosa in shape. Females have wings shorter than the abdomen, very similar to some Stagmomantis species, but easily distinguished if the hindwings are visible.

Reproduction

Two novel I. oratoria survival strategies may have contributed to the expansion of this species beyond its original range, and its success in areas formerly occupied by other mantids such as Stagmomantis carolina. Firstly, this species is capable of parthenogenic reproduction when males are scarce. Secondly, additional  I. oratoria nymphs may emerge from their oothecae in the second season after the egg case is produced, i.e., when their siblings are already grown and are producing their own offspring.

Hatching
At a field site in Davis, CA, S. limbata hatched earlier in the season than Iris oratoria, and Iris oratoria tended to persist longer into the year.

Behaviour

The Mediterranean mantis is known for two distinctive behaviours, apart from the ambush hunting common to other mantids: cannibalism and deimatic or threat displays.  The sexual cannibalism of mantids known in popular culture occurs in roughly one quarter of all intersexual encounters of I. oratoria.

When the mantis is under attack, it sets in motion a complex series of actions which combine to form a startling deimatic display. The mantis turns to face the aggressor, rears up by arching its back, curls its abdomen upwards (dorsiflexion), raises and waves its forelimbs, raises its wings to displays the large brightly coloured eyespots on the hindwings, and stridulates by scraping the edge of its hindwings against its tegmina, the leathery front wings.

Diet
Compared to Stagmomantis limbata, Iris oratoria eats a lesser portion of Orthopteran insects and does not eat as much long bodied insects.  S. limbata adults have longer pronota and forelegs than I. oratoria adults. This difference in body size might be an important cause of the dietary differences between the species.  Furthermore, the earlier hatch date for S. limbata also might reduce the overlap in Iris oratoria and Stagmomantis limbata diets.

Gallery

See also
 Stagmomantis
 Pseudomantis albofimbriata
 List of mantis genera and species

Bibliography

References

Tarachodidae
Mantodea of Europe
Fauna of Greece
Fauna of Italy
Fauna of Spain
Insects described in 1758
Mantodea of Asia
Mantodea of North America
Taxa named by Carl Linnaeus